The 2019 Marylebone Cricket Club University Matches were a series of cricket matches that were played between the eighteen County Championship teams and the six Marylebone Cricket Club University teams (MCCU) of England and Wales. The first two rounds of fixtures were classed as first-class matches. Each county side played one fixture against an MCCU side ahead of the start of the 2019 County Championship.

In the opening round of fixtures, Alastair Cook scored 150 not out for Essex against Cambridge MCCU, in his first match since retiring from Test cricket. The opening round also saw Somerset beat Cardiff MCCU by 568 runs, a record margin for a first-class match in England. In the third and final round of matches, England Test cricketer Haseeb Hameed scored a double century, albeit in a fixture without first-class status.

In August 2019, the England and Wales Cricket Board (ECB) announced that the 2020 fixtures will be the last ones to have first-class status.

Fixtures

Round 1

Round 2

Round 3

References

External links
 Series home at ESPN Cricinfo

Marylebone Cricket Club University Matches
English domestic cricket competitions